The 1985 Budweiser GT was the sixth round of the 1985 World Endurance Championship. Several teams from the Camel GT Championship also participated, under the GTP, GTO, and GTU classes. It took place at Mosport Park, Canada on August 11, 1985.

Winkelhock accident
In the early portions of the race, Manfred Winkelhock was driving the Kremer Racing Porsche 962C after taking over from teammate Marc Surer. At the beginning of the car's 69th lap, Winkelhock's Porsche went off course during the long downhill Turn 2. The car hit the concrete barrier at the bottom of the hill head-on. Caution came out immediately and lasted for 56 minutes as safety crews attempted to extract Winkelhock from the wreckage.

Winkelhock was flown by medical helicopter to Sunnybrook Medical Centre  near Toronto suffering from severe head trauma while the race resumed. Winkelhock died the following day after failing to recover from surgery.

Official results
Class winners in bold. Cars failing to complete 75% of the winner's distance marked as Not Classified (NC).

† - #80 Carma F.F. was disqualified after completing the final lap of the race too slowly.

Statistics
 Pole Position - #2 Rothmans Porsche - 1:09.775
 Fastest Lap - #2 Rothmans Porsche - 1:12.915
 Average Speed - 168.886 km/h

References

External links
 1985 Mosport 1000 Race Highlights (YouTube)

Mosport
Mosport
Grand Prix of Mosport
1985 in Ontario